Chengelchal is a 2,709 m high peak in the Pirin mountain range, south-western Bulgaria. It is located in the northern part of Pirin on the mountain's main ridge to the south of the summit of Dzhano (2,668 m), with which it is linked via a narrow and rocky saddle known as Malkoto Konche.

Citations

References 
 

Mountains of Bulgaria
Mountains of Pirin
Landforms of Blagoevgrad Province
Two-thousanders of Bulgaria